Krok is an unincorporated community in the town of West Kewaunee in Kewaunee County, Wisconsin, United States. Krok is situated near the origin of the East Twin River and its tributary, Krok Creek, just west of East Krok. The community was founded by Czech immigrants from Bohemia, now in the Czech Republic. The Krok post office was established by Wojta Stransky in January 1875.

References

Unincorporated communities in Wisconsin
Unincorporated communities in Kewaunee County, Wisconsin
Czech-American culture in Wisconsin